Adlan Dzhunidovich Akiev, is a Russian Greco-Roman wrestler. He won one of the bronze medals in the 82 kg event at the 2021 World Wrestling Championships held in Oslo, Norway. In 2021, he also won the gold medal in the 82 kg event at the European Wrestling Championships held in Warsaw, Poland.

Career 

At the 2017 European Wrestling Championships held in Novi Sad, Serbia, he won one of the bronze medals in the 80 kg event. In his bronze medal match he defeated Daniel Aleksandrov of Bulgaria.

In March 2021, he won the gold medal in the 82 kg event at the Matteo Pellicone Ranking Series 2021 held in Rome, Italy.

Achievements

References

External links 
 

Living people
Sportspeople from Chechnya
Russian male sport wrestlers
European Wrestling Champions
World Wrestling Championships medalists
1993 births
21st-century Russian people